Lymeon is a genus of ichneumon wasps in the family Ichneumonidae. There are at least 80 described species in Lymeon.

Species
These 84 species belong to the genus Lymeon:

 Lymeon acceptus (Cresson, 1874) c g
 Lymeon adjicialis (Cresson, 1874) c g
 Lymeon adultus (Cresson, 1874) c g
 Lymeon affinis (Taschenberg, 1876) c g
 Lymeon albispina (Cameron, 1911) c
 Lymeon alboannulatus (Taschenberg, 1876) c g
 Lymeon apollinarii (Brethes, 1926) c g
 Lymeon ariolator (Linnaeus, 1758) c g
 Lymeon atrator Kasparyan & Ruiz-Cancino, 2004 c g
 Lymeon bicinctus (Cresson, 1865) c g
 Lymeon bifasciator (Thunberg, 1822) c g
 Lymeon bifasciatus (Szepligeti, 1916) c
 Lymeon brasiliensis (Brethes, 1927) c
 Lymeon caney Tzankov & Alayo, 1974 c g
 Lymeon cinctipes (Cameron, 1911) c g
 Lymeon cinctiventris (Cushman, 1929) c g
 Lymeon clavatorius (Fabricius, 1804) c g
 Lymeon cratodontus (Cameron, 1911) c g
 Lymeon curtispinus (Cameron, 1911) c g
 Lymeon dieloceri (Costa Lima, 1937) c g
 Lymeon fasciatiipennis (Cameron, 1911) c g
 Lymeon fasciipennis (Brulle, 1846) c
 Lymeon flavovariegatus (Cameron, 1886) c g
 Lymeon fuscipennis (Brulle, 1846) c
 Lymeon gracilipes (Brues & Richardson, 1913) c g
 Lymeon guyanaensis (Cameron, 1911) c g
 Lymeon haemorrhoidalis (Taschenberg, 1876) c g
 Lymeon imbecillis (Cresson, 1868) c g
 Lymeon imitatorius (Fabricius, 1804) c g
 Lymeon ingenuus (Cresson, 1874) c g
 Lymeon interruptus (Cameron, 1911) c g
 Lymeon junctus (Cresson, 1874) c g
 Lymeon lassatus (Cresson, 1874) c g
 Lymeon lepidus (Brulle, 1846) c
 Lymeon maculipes (Cameron, 1904) c g
 Lymeon mandibularis Kasparyan & Ruiz-Cancino, 2004 c g
 Lymeon mexicanus (Cameron, 1886) c
 Lymeon mimeticus Tzankov & Alayo, 1974 c g
 Lymeon minutus Kasparyan & Ruiz g
 Lymeon montanus Tzankov & Alayo, 1974 c g
 Lymeon moratus (Cresson, 1874) c g
 Lymeon nasutus (Pratt, 1945) c g
 Lymeon nigriceps (Szepligeti, 1916) c
 Lymeon nigromaculatus (Taschenberg, 1876) c g
 Lymeon novatus (Cresson, 1874) c g
 Lymeon orbus (Say, 1835) c g b
 Lymeon ornatipennis (Cameron, 1911) c
 Lymeon ovivorus (Hancock, 1926) c g
 Lymeon patruelis (Cresson, 1874) c g
 Lymeon photopsis (Viereck, 1913) c g
 Lymeon pilosus (Taschenberg, 1876) c g
 Lymeon pleuralis (Szepligeti, 1916) c g
 Lymeon praedator (Fabricius, 1804) c g
 Lymeon pulcher (Dalla Torre, 1902) c g
 Lymeon pulcratorius (Thunberg, 1822) c g
 Lymeon rufatus Kasparyan & Ruiz-Cancino, 2004 c g
 Lymeon ruficeps (Szepligeti, 1916) c
 Lymeon rufinotum Kasparyan & Ruiz-Cancino, 2004 c g
 Lymeon rufipes (Szepligeti, 1916) c
 Lymeon rufithorax (Cameron, 1886) c
 Lymeon rufiventris (Brulle, 1846) c
 Lymeon rufoalbus Kasparyan & Ruiz-Cancino, 2004 c g
 Lymeon rufoniger Kasparyan & Ruiz-Cancino, 2004 c g
 Lymeon rufotibialis Kasparyan & Ruiz-Cancino, 2004 c g
 Lymeon sanguineus (Taschenberg, 1876) c g
 Lymeon setosus (Szepligeti, 1916) c
 Lymeon sexlineatus (Cameron, 1886) c
 Lymeon striatus (Brulle, 1846) c
 Lymeon subflavescens (Cresson, 1865) c g
 Lymeon sulsus (Cresson, 1874) c g
 Lymeon tantillus (Cresson, 1874) c g
 Lymeon tarsalis (Szepligeti, 1916) c g
 Lymeon tinctipennis Kasparyan & Ruiz-Cancino, 2004 c g
 Lymeon tobiasi Kasparyan, 2004 c g
 Lymeon transilis (Cresson, 1874) c g
 Lymeon tricolor (Brulle, 1846) c
 Lymeon tricoloripes Kasparyan & Ruiz-Cancino, 2004 c g
 Lymeon trifasciatellus (Dalla Torre, 1902) c g
 Lymeon tuheitensis (Brues & Richardson, 1913) c g
 Lymeon utilis (Szepligeti, 1916) c g
 Lymeon varicoxa (Szepligeti, 1916) c
 Lymeon variicoxa (Szepligeti, 1916) c g
 Lymeon xanthogaster (Brulle, 1846) c
 Lymeon yanegai Kasparyan, 2004 c g

Data sources: i = ITIS, c = Catalogue of Life, g = GBIF, b = Bugguide.net

References

Further reading

External links

 

Parasitic wasps